Anna Abigail Thynn, Marchioness of Bath (née Gyarmathy; 27 September 1943 – 17 September 2022), styled as Viscountess Weymouth from 1969 and 1992, also known by her stage name Anna Gaël, was a Hungarian-British actress and war correspondent.

Early life 
Anna Abigail Gyarmarthy was born on 27 September 1943 in Budapest, Hungary. Her father, László Izsak Gyarmathy, was a mathematician and her mother was a poet. She moved to France as a child and began acting when she was fifteen.

Career 
Anna Gyarmarthy acted under the stage name 'Anna Gaël'. She starred in Hungarian, German, Italian and French films including Via Macau in 1966, Therese and Isabelle in 1968, Zeta One, aka The Love Factor in 1969, and Take Me, Love Me in 1970. She retired from acting in 1981. She worked as a news reporter, covering conflicts in Vietnam, and South Africa as well as the Northern Ireland conflict.

Personal life and death 
Gaël met Alexander Thynn, Viscount Weymouth, the son of Henry Thynne, 6th Marquess of Bath, and Daphne Fielding, in Paris in 1959. She later became the Viscount's mistress while she was married to French film director Gilbert Pineau; in 1969, the Viscount and Gaël married. Later that year she gave birth to their first child, Lenka Thynn. In 1974 she gave birth to their second child, Ceawlin Thynn. In 1992 her husband succeeded his father as the 7th Marquess of Bath; he died in April 2020.

In 2013 her son married Emma McQuiston, the daughter of Nigerian businessman Oladipo Jadesimi. Gaël reportedly disapproved of her son's marriage due to her daughter-in-law's African ancestry. She did not attend the wedding.

Thynn died in Paris on 17 September 2022, at the age of 78, ten days before her 79th birthday.

Filmography 
1962: Una storia milanese
1966: Via Macau
1967: Hell Is Empty
1967: Hotel Clausewitz
1967: To Commit a Murder
1968: Benjamin ou Les Mémoires d'un puceau
1968: Murder at the Grand Hotel (Le Démoniaque)
1968: Therese and Isabelle
1968: Béru et ces dames
1969: The House of the Missing Girls (Traquenards)
1969: Zeta One
1969: The Bridge at Remagen
1969: Delitto al circolo del tennis
1970: Take Me, Love Me
1970: Nana
1971: The Persuaders! (episode: "The Old, the New and the Deadly")
1973: Blue Blood
1974: Le Plumard en folie
1976: Dracula père et fils
1976: The Porter from Maxim's
1978: Sweeney 2
1978: L'Hôtel de la plage

References

External links 

1943 births
2022 deaths
20th-century Hungarian actresses
Actresses from Budapest
Bath
English war correspondents
Hungarian film actresses
Hungarian journalists
Hungarian women journalists
Anna
Women war correspondents